Exaeretia indubitatella is a moth in the family Depressariidae. It is found in Mongolia and Russia (Altai mountains, Tuva, Transbaikalia).

References

Moths described in 1971
Exaeretia
Moths of Asia